Clare Lawrence Moody (born 1975) is an English television and stage actor and producer. She is the daughter of English television director Laurence Moody. She is also credited as Clare Lawrence.

Biography
Born in Saddleworth, Greater Manchester, Moody was educated at Lady Eleanor Holles School and trained at the Guildhall School of Music and Drama, all the while acting in TV (she had first acted as a child in Crown Court and Coronation Street). She gained a first class degree in English at New Hall, Cambridge, before being cast alongside future Dames Joan Plowright and Dorothy Tutin in the film This Could Be the Last Time (1998). She has since appeared in EastEnders, Ultimate Force, The Bill, Bad Girls, Longitude (2000), Harry and Pride (2014).

She appeared onstage at the Royal National Theatre as Ruth Fry in Fram (2008) by Tony Harrison, in Mine (2008) by Polly Teale for Shared Experience, and as Dorothy Markham in "The Girls of Slender Means" by Muriel Spark adapted by Judith Adams.Her radio work includes leads in Let's Murder Vivaldi (a 2008 adaptation of David Mercer's television play), 27 Wagons Full of Cotton, Amerika and Ghost in the Mechanic.

She and Anna Waterhouse also run the West End theatre production company Out Of The Blue Productions. Its productions have included This Is Our Youth by Kenneth Lonergan starring amongst four casts Matt Damon, Jake Gyllenhaal and Anna Paquin, A Life In The Theatre starring Patrick Stewart and Oleanna by David Mamet with Aaron Eckhart, and Some Girl(s) by Neil LaBute with David Schwimmer. Lawrence has also produced Fool for Love with Juliette Lewis. In 2004 she was named by the Observer Newspaper as one of the 80 young people predicted to shape the culture of her generation.

Family
Actor Ron Moody and historian Lisa Jardine are both cousins.

References
 - Interview in the Daily Telegraph
 - Observer Newspaper, The Bright Stuff.
 - Review of "Mine" in the London Evening Standard
 - London Metro review of "Mine"

External links
 
 Clare Lawrence - biography as company member at the Royal National Theatre

1975 births
Alumni of New Hall, Cambridge
Alumni of the Guildhall School of Music and Drama
English child actresses
Living people
People from Saddleworth
People educated at Lady Eleanor Holles School
English Jews
Jewish English actresses
English stage actresses
English film actresses
English television actresses